Turnabout is a 1940 fantasy comedy film directed by Hal Roach and starring Adolphe Menjou, Carole Landis and John Hubbard. Based on the 1931 novel of the same name by Thorne Smith, the screenplay was written by Mickell Novack, Bernie Giler and John McClain with additional dialogue by Rian James. In 1979, the screenplay was adapted for the short-lived television series with the same name.

Plot
Tim and Sally Willows (John Hubbard and Carole Landis) are a spoiled well-off couple who constantly bicker and cannot agree on anything.

Tim Willows is considered to be the main cog in the machinery of his own advertising company Manning, Willows, and Clare. His wife Sally is his exact opposite, pampering herself in their home all day. And when Tim gets home, they start arguing, constantly watched by a strange Indian idol they got from a distant relative of Tim. They call it Mr. Ram.

After one extraordinarily stressful day at the office, Tim comes home to find Sally in the bath, and they start arguing like never before. In the heat of the moment, Tim expresses a wish to switch places with his lazy wife, to see how she goes about her days at nearly half speed. Sally also makes the same wish, seriously doubting the strain of running the advertising firm, having fun all day long. The Indian idol on the wall overhears their respective wishes and makes them come true, speaking loudly from its place on the wall.

When the couple wake up the next morning they have indeed switched places and bodies with each other. Chaos ensues, as active Tim stays home with the servants and wives of his colleagues all day, in Sally's body, while she goes to work and manages to be rude to the firm's biggest client. Sally also succeeds in landing another client that Tim had denied business before.

When the couple finally meet again in their home at night, they both beg on their bare knees to switch back into their regular bodies again. Their wish is granted this time too, and life goes back to normal. Tim has to clean up the mess Sally made at the firm, and she apologizes to all their friends. They blame everything on the fact that Sally is pregnant.

When everything seems to be just fine and dandy again, Mr. Ram explains that he made a mistake when changing them back into their ordinary bodies, and as it now happens, Tim is the one who is pregnant.

Cast
 Adolphe Menjou as Phil Manning
 Carole Landis as Sally Willows
 John Hubbard as Tim Willows
 William Gargan as Joel Clare
 Verree Teasdale as Laura Bannister
 Mary Astor as Marion Manning
 Donald Meek as Henry – the Valet
 Joyce Compton as Irene Clare
 Inez Courtney as Miss Edwards
 Franklin Pangborn as Mr. Alan Pingboom
 Marjorie Main as Nora – the Cook
 Berton Churchill as Julian Marlowe 
 Margaret Roach as Dixie Gale
 Ray Turner as Mose
 Norman Budd as Jimmy 
 Polly Ann Young as Miss Gertie Twill
 Eleanor Riley as Lorraine
 Murray Alper as Doc – the Masseur
 Miki Morita as Ito
 Yolande Donlan as Marie – the Maid
 Georges Renavent as Mr. Ram

References

External links
 Turnabout photos
 
 
 
 

1940 films
1940s fantasy comedy films
American fantasy comedy films
American screwball comedy films
American sex comedy films
American black-and-white films
Body swapping in films
1940s English-language films
Films based on American novels
Films based on fantasy novels
Films directed by Hal Roach
United Artists films
Films shot in New Jersey
Films shot in Pennsylvania
1940 comedy films
1940s American films
1940s sex comedy films